James Edwin Nash (born February 9, 1945), commonly known as Jim Nash, is a retired American professional baseball pitcher. He debuted on July 3, 1966 against the Detroit Tigers after then Kansas City Athletics signed him as a free agent. During his rookie season in 1966 he went 12–1 with a 2.06 earned run average in 127 innings pitched as part of the kiddie corps of pitchers featured in Kansas City. He also received the only two votes not won by Tommie Agee for the American League Rookie of the Year Award. Nash would appear on the cover of the March 13, 1967 Sports Illustrated and was featured in a story along with up and coming pitchers Catfish Hunter and Blue Moon Odom.  Nash however failed to live up to the hype from his first two seasons, battling shoulder soreness, and ended with a career record of 68 wins and 64 losses with a lifetime ERA of 3.58, allowing 1,050 hits and 441 earned runs in 1,107.1 innings pitched. He went on to play 4 seasons for the Athletics and 3 seasons for the Atlanta Braves, playing his final season with the Philadelphia Phillies in 1972.

References

External links
 or Baseball-Almanac

1945 births
Living people
Kansas City Athletics players
Atlanta Braves players
Philadelphia Phillies players
Major League Baseball pitchers
Baseball players from Georgia (U.S. state)
Baseball players from Nevada
Birmingham Barons players
Burlington Bees players
Lewiston Broncs players
Mobile A's players
Birmingham A's players
People from Hawthorne, Nevada
People from Marietta, Georgia